Vicente Rubén Principiano (born 3 October 1978) was an Argentine footballer.

He played for clubs like Racing Club de Avellaneda or Chilean Colo-Colo. In this last team, he was member of the 2002 Torneo Apertura champion squad alongside his compatriots Nicolás Tagliani and Marcelo Espina.

Honours

Club
Racing Club
 Argentine Primera División (1): 2001 Clausura

Colo-Colo
 Primera División de Chile (1): 2002 Clausura

External links
 
 

1978 births
Living people
Argentine footballers
Argentine expatriate footballers
Mamelodi Sundowns F.C. players
Racing Club de Avellaneda footballers
Colo-Colo footballers
C.D. Olmedo footballers
F.C. Matera players
Monagas S.C. players
Deportivo Morón footballers
Chilean Primera División players
Argentine Primera División players
Argentine expatriate sportspeople in Chile
Expatriate footballers in Chile
Expatriate footballers in Peru
Expatriate footballers in Italy
Expatriate footballers in Ecuador
Expatriate footballers in Venezuela
Expatriate soccer players in South Africa
Association football forwards
Footballers from Buenos Aires